The 1983 Peter Jackson Classic was contested from June 30 to July 3 at Beaconsfield Golf Club. It was the 11th edition of the Peter Jackson Classic, and the fifth edition as a major championship on the LPGA Tour.

This event was won by Hollis Stacy.

Final leaderboard

External links
 Golf Observer source

Canadian Women's Open
Peter Jackson Classic
Peter Jackson Classic
Peter Jackson Classic
Peter Jackson Classic
Peter Jackson Classic